Pseudoxyops is a genus consisting of 5 species of mantises in the subfamily Vatinae.

See also
List of mantis genera and species

References

 
Mantodea genera